The Gloster Southern Railroad  was a United States shortline railroad that operated in Mississippi and Louisiana.  The GLSR began operation in 1990 and provided freight service from Gloster, Mississippi, to the Illinois Central Railroad (now Canadian National Railway - CN) interchange at Slaughter, Louisiana.

The line was owned by Georgia-Pacific (GP) which had purchased and refurbished  of an abandoned branch line to provide service to a GP oakwood mill in Gloster.  The GLSR operated four or five freight trains per week until the plant closed in December 2002. One year later, Genesee and Wyoming Inc acquired three short-line railroads from GP. However, this sale did not include the GLSR.

In September 2004, GP announced that they would re-open the Gloster oakwood mill. However, they did not continue to operate the GLSR. The McComb Enterprise Journal reported on April 2, 2008, that the Georgia-Pacific Corporation is closing its railroad and that the town of Gloster was interested in the rail bed.

The Gloster Southern Railroad applied to discontinue service on its entire line in December 2009,  and crews began removing the railway and roadbed. By June 2013, it was reported that all of the track had been moved and sold for recycle.

Equipment

References 

 American Shortline Railway Guide, 5th Edition, p135
 
 
 
 

 

Louisiana railroads
Mississippi railroads
Spin-offs of the Illinois Central Gulf Railroad